Some Assembly Required is a teen comedy series that is streamed on Netflix (seasons 1-2) and Amazon Prime Video (season 3). YTV created the series and aired it in Canada. 57 episodes aired over three seasons before the series was cancelled.

Series overview

Episodes

Season 1 (2014)

Season 2 (2015−16)

Season 3 (2016)

References

Lists of comedy television series episodes